Pig tail, also referred to as pigtail and pork tail, are the tails from a pig used as a food ingredient in many cuisines. Pig tails can be smoked, fried, or roasted in barbecue sauce.

They are also brine cured or used as jelly stock for brawn. Pig tails are used in the cuisine of the American South in various recipes with black-eyed peas, collard greens, red beans, and kalalloo. 

In the Caribbean salted pig tails are used. In Puerto Rico, pig tails are eaten raw in sandwiches; after being cleansed it is microwaved, for about thirty seconds, and eaten with cheese, mustard, and mayom usually on a ciabatta roll.  In Guadeloupe pig tail is used to flavor stews and soups.

See also
 List of smoked foods

References

Cuts of pork
Smoked meat